Phrynus is a genus of whip spiders found in tropical and subtropical regions, mostly in the new world.

Appearance
Like other species of the order Amblypygi, species of the genus Phrynus are dorso-ventrally flattened arachnids with elongate, antenniform front legs used to navigate their environment and communicate with conspecifics. Individuals capture prey using raptorial pedipalps. Phrynus species vary in size, from the small Phrynus marginemaculatus to the larger Phrynus longipes. At least one species of Phrynus is territorial and cannibalistic (Phrynus longipes). Phrynus is a New World genus, found from the southern United States to northern South America; the sole exception is Phrynus exsul from Indonesia.

List of species 
Phrynus alejandroi Armas & Teruel, 2010
Phrynus araya Colmenares Garcia & Villarreal Manzanilla 2008 
Phrynus asperatipes Wood, 1863
Phrynus barbadensis (Pocock, 1894)
Phrynus calypso Joya, 2017
Phrynus cozumel Armas, 1995
Phrynus damonidaensis Quintero, 1981 
Phrynus decoratus Teruel & Armas, 2005 
Phrynus eucharis Armas & Perez Gonzalez, 2001
Phrynus exsul Harvey 2002
Phrynus fuscimanus Koch, 1847
Phrynus garridoi Armas, 1994
Phrynus gervaisii (Pocock, 1894)
Phrynus goesii Thorell, 1889
Phrynus hispaniolae Armas & Perez Gonzalez, 2001
Phrynus hoffmannae Armas & Gadar, 2004 
Phrynus kennidae Armas & Perez Gonzalez, 2001
Phrynus levii Quintero, 1981 
Phrynus longipes (Pocock, 1894)
Phrynus maesi Armas, 1996 
Phrynus marginemaculatus Koch, 1841
Phrynus noeli Armas & Perez, 1994 
Phrynus operculatus Pocock, 1902	
Phrynus palenque Armas, 1995
Phrynus panche Armas & Angarita Arias 2008  
Phrynus parvulus Pocock, 1902
Phrynus pinarensis Franganillo, 1930 
Phrynus pinero Armas & Avila Calvo, 2000 
Phrynus pseudoparvulus Armas & Viquez, 2001
Phrynus pulchripes (Pocock, 1894)
Phrynus santarensis (Pocock, 1894)
Phrynus similis Armas, Viquez & Trujillo, 2013
Phrynus tessellatus (Pocock, 1894)
Phrynus viridescens Franganillo, 1931 
Phrynus whitei Gervais, 1842
†Phrynus fossilis Keferstein, 1834
†Phrynus mexicana Poinar & Brown, 2004 
†Phrynus resinae (Schawaller, 1979)

Original publication 
Lamarck, 1801 : Système des Animaux sans vertèbres, ou tableau général des classes, des ordres et des genres de ces animaux. Paris, .

References

Arachnid genera
Taxa named by Jean-Baptiste Lamarck
Amblypygi